William Scott Ritter Jr. (born July 15, 1961) is an American author, pundit, former United States Marine Corps intelligence officer, former United Nations Special Commission (UNSCOM) weapons inspector, and convicted sex offender. 

Ritter served as a junior military analyst during Operation Desert Storm. He then served as a member of the UNSCOM overseeing the disarmament of weapons of mass destruction (WMD) in Iraq from 1991 to 1998, from which he resigned in protest. He later became a critic of the Iraq War and United States foreign policy in the Middle East. More recently, he has been a defender of Russia during the 2022 invasion of Ukraine, writing a series of opinion pieces for Russian state media outlet RT. 

Ritter was the subject of police sting operations for sex crimes in 2001 and 2009, and was convicted of sex crimes involving a minor in 2011.

Early and personal life
Ritter was born into a military family in 1961 in Gainesville, Florida. He graduated from Kaiserslautern American High School in Kaiserslautern, Germany in 1979, and later from Franklin and Marshall College in Lancaster, Pennsylvania, with a Bachelor of Arts in the history of the Soviet Union and departmental honors.

Military background
In 1980, Ritter served in the U.S. Army as a private. Then, in May 1984, he was commissioned as an intelligence officer in the United States Marine Corps. He served in this capacity for about 12 years. He served as the lead analyst for the Marine Corps Rapid Deployment Force concerning the Soviet invasion of Afghanistan and the Iran–Iraq War.

Ritter's academic work focused on the Basmachi resistance movement in Soviet Central Asia during the 1920s and 1930s, and on the Basmachi commanders Fazail Maksum and Ibrahim Bek.

During Desert Storm (1991), as a Marine captain, he served as a ballistic missile intelligence analyst under General Norman Schwarzkopf. Ritter filed multiple internal reports challenging Schwarzkopf's claim that the US had destroyed  "as many as 16" of Iraq's estimated 20 mobile Scud missile launchers, arguing that they could not be confirmed. In 1992 Ritter was quoted in a New York Times op-ed saying "No mobile Scud launchers were destroyed during the war." Ritter later worked as a security and military consultant for the Fox News network. Ritter also had "a long relationship [...] of an official nature" with the UK's foreign intelligence spy agency MI6 according to an interview he gave to Democracy Now! in 2003.

Weapons inspector
Ritter worked as a weapons inspector for the United Nations Special Commission  from 1991 to 1998, which was charged with finding and destroying all weapons of mass destruction and WMD-related manufacturing capabilities in Iraq. He was chief inspector in fourteen of the more than thirty inspection missions in which he participated.

Ritter was amongst a group of UNSCOM weapons inspectors that regularly took Lockheed U-2 imagery to Israel for analysis, as UNSCOM was not getting sufficient analysis assistance from the United States and the United Kingdom.  This was not authorized by UNSCOM, the American U-2 having been loaned to UNSCOM and caused Ritter to be subjected to criticism and investigation by U.S. authorities. Iraq protested about the supply of such information to Israel.

Operation Mass Appeal
Beginning in December 1997, Ritter, with the approval of UNSCOM head Richard Butler and other top UNSCOM leaders, began to supply the UK's foreign intelligence service MI6 with documents and briefings on UNSCOM's findings to be used for MI6's propaganda effort dubbed "Operation Mass Appeal": "I was approached by the British intelligence service, which I had, again, a long relationship with, of an official nature, to see if there was any information in the archives of UNSCOM that could be handed to the British, so that they could in turn work it over, determine its veracity, and then seek to plant it in media outlets around the world, in an effort to try to shape the public opinion of those countries, and then indirectly, through, for instance, a report showing up in the Polish press, shape public opinion in Great Britain and the United States.

"I went to Richard Butler with the request from the British. He said that he supported this, and we initiated a cooperation that was very short-lived. The first reports were passed to the British sometime in February of 1998. There was a detailed planning meeting in June of 1998, and I resigned in August of 1998. [...] This is an operation—Operation Mass Appeal, that had been going on prior to UNSCOM being asked to be the source of particular data, and it's an operation that continued after my resignation."

Last weapons inspections in 1998 
In January 1998, Ritter's inspection team in Iraq was blocked from some weapons sites by Iraqi officials who stated that information obtained from these sites would be used for future planning of attacks. UN Inspectors were ordered out of Iraq by the United States Government, shortly before Operation Desert Fox attacks began in December 1998, using information which had been gathered for the purpose of disarmament to identify targets which would reduce Iraq's ability to wage both conventional and possibly unconventional warfare. UN Weapons Inspectors were thereafter denied access to Iraq. Ritter spoke on the Public Broadcasting Service show, The NewsHour with Jim Lehrer:
I think the danger right now is that without effective inspections, without effective monitoring, Iraq can in a very short period of time measured in months, reconstitute chemical and biological weapons, long-range ballistic missiles to deliver these weapons, and even certain aspects of their developing of nuclear weapons. program.

When the United States and the UN Security Council failed to take action against Iraq for their ongoing failure to cooperate fully with inspectors (a breach of United Nations Security Council Resolution 1154), Ritter resigned from the United Nations Special Commission on August 26, 1998.

In his letter of resignation, Ritter said the Security Council's reaction to Iraq's decision earlier that month to suspend co-operation with the inspection team made a mockery of the disarmament work. Ritter later said, in an interview, that he resigned from his role as a United Nations weapons inspector over inconsistencies between United Nations Security Council Resolution 1154 and how it was implemented.
The investigations had come to a standstill, were making no effective progress, and in order to make effective progress, we really needed the Security Council to step in a meaningful fashion and seek to enforce its resolutions that we're not complying with.

On September 3, 1998, several days after his resignation, Ritter testified before the United States Senate Committee on Armed Services and the United States Senate Committee on Foreign Relations and said that he resigned his position "out of frustration that the United Nations Security Council, and the United States as its most significant supporter, was failing to enforce the post-Gulf War resolutions designed to disarm Iraq." Ritter said that Secretary of State Madeleine K. Albright had supposedly "blocked more inspections in 1997 than Saddam Hussein did," a charge which Albright disputed.

During the testimony on September 3, 1998, Ritter was asked by Senator Joseph Biden about his position on inspections, which Biden criticized as "confrontation-based policy." According to Barton Gellman, Biden questioned if the inspector was trying to "appropriate the power 'to decide when to pull the trigger' of military force against Iraq," with Biden stating that the Secretary of State would also have to consider the opinion of allies, the United Nations Security Council and public opinion, before any potential intervention in Iraq. Later on, Biden stated that the decision was "above [Ritter's] pay grade." According to Gellman, Senate Democrats joined Biden and "amplified on the Clinton administration's counterattack [against] Scott Ritter" with exceptions such as John Kerry, while Senate Republicans "were unanimous in describing Ritter's disclosures as highly damaging to the credibility of the Clinton administration on one of its core foreign policies."

Ritter’s testimony was disputed by Richard Butler, chief UN arms inspector for Iraq, who claimed Ritter made factual errors and harmed UNSCOM's mission. The previous chief inspector for Iraq, Rolf Ekéus, said that Ritter was "not in a position to know all of the considerations that go into decision making on the commission," and defended Albright's support for UNSCOM. Albright also publicly disputed Ritter’s claims in a speech, saying "In fact, the United States has been by far the strongest international backer of UNSCOM. We have provided indispensable technical and logistical support. We've pushed and pushed and pushed some more to help UNSCOM break through the smoke screen of lies and deceptions put out by the Iraqi regime."

Reception as weapons inspector
Richard Butler, Ritter's former UNSCOM boss, said that Ritter "wasn't prescient" in his predictions about WMDs, saying, "When he was the 'Alpha Dog' inspector, then by God, there were more weapons there, and we had to go find them—a contention for which he had inadequate evidence. When he became a peacenik, then it was all complete B.S., start to finish, and there were no weapons of mass destruction. And that also was a contention for which he had inadequate evidence." 

Writing in The New York Times, Matt Bai said that Butler's caveat notwithstanding, Ritter was in fact vindicated about Iraq's lack of WMDs and that the aftermath of the war could be calamitous. Bai described Ritter as the "most determined dissenter and the one with the most on-the-ground intelligence" of the situation in Iraq prior to the war.

However, Bai went on to compare Ritter's insistence during his 2011 trial for sex offences that his conduct was of no consequence to the wider community—and his unwillingness to consider a plea agreement—to the stridency with which Ritter advocated for his views on Iraq: "If there is a connection between Ritter the activist and Ritter the accused, though, it probably lies in the uncompromising, even heedless way in which he insists on his version of reality, and how he sees himself always as the victim of a system that is self-evidently corrupt. ... the very attribute that made Scott Ritter appear somehow clairvoyant on Iraq—his refusal to accede to everyone else's sense of reality—is the same one that has led him, now, to ruin."

U.S. policy toward Iraq

Following his resignation from UNSCOM, Ritter continued to be an outspoken commentator on U.S. policy toward Iraq, particularly with respect to the WMD issue. He became a popular anti-war figure and talk show commentator.

Ritter and Operation Desert Fox
In a 2005 interview, Ritter criticized the Clinton administration's use of a blocked inspection of a Ba'ath party headquarters to justify Operation Desert Fox, a three-day bombing campaign in December 1998 that saw inspectors withdrawn from Iraq where they would not return until late 2002. However, in his 1999 book Endgame, Ritter explained that he was the one who had originally pushed for the fateful inspection of the Ba'ath party headquarters over the doubts of his boss Richard Butler and also planned to use 37 inspectors. It was temporarily cancelled because Iraq broke off cooperation in August 1998.

Commentary in the post-inspection period

In Endgame: Solving the Iraq Problem — Once and For All, Ritter restated that Iraq had obstructed the work of inspectors and attempted to hide and preserve essential elements for restarting WMD programs at a later date. However, he also expressed frustration at alleged attempts by the Central Intelligence Agency (CIA) to infiltrate UNSCOM and use the inspectors as a means of gathering intelligence with which to pursue regime change in Iraq – a violation of the terms under which UNSCOM operated, and the very rationale the Iraqi government had given in restricting the inspector's activities in 1998.

In the book's conclusion, Ritter criticized the U.S. policy of containment in the absence of inspections as inadequate to prevent Iraq's re-acquisition of WMD's in the long term. He also rejected the notion of removing Saddam Hussein's regime by force. Instead, he advocated a policy of diplomatic engagement, leading to gradual normalization of international relations with Iraq in return for inspection-verified abandonment of their WMD programs and other objectionable policies.

Ritter again promoted a conciliatory approach toward Iraq in the 2000 documentary In Shifting Sands: The Truth About UNSCOM and the Disarming of Iraq, which he wrote and directed. The film tells the history of the UNSCOM investigations through interviews and video footage of inspection missions. In the film, Ritter argues that Iraq is a "defanged tiger" and that the inspections were successful in eliminating significant Iraqi WMD capabilities. (For more see below under "Documentary".)

In 2002, Ritter travelled to Iraq to address the Iraqi Parliament as a private citizen. He told the parliament the U.S. was about to make an "historical mistake" and urged it to allow inspections to resume.

Iraq War predictions
Just after the coalition invasion of Iraq had been launched, but prior to troops arriving in Baghdad, British Prime Minister Tony Blair told the Parliament of the United Kingdom that the United States and the United Kingdom believed they had "sufficient forces" in Iraq. At that very time Ritter offered an opposing view on Portuguese radio station TSF: "The United States is going to leave Iraq with its tail between its legs, defeated. It is a war we can not win ... We do not have the military means to take over Baghdad and for this reason I believe the defeat of the United States in this war is inevitable ... Every time we confront Iraqi troops we may win some tactical battles, as we did for ten years in Vietnam, but we will not be able to win this war, which in my opinion is already lost," Ritter added.

Commentary on Iraq's lack of WMDs
Despite identifying himself as a Republican, and having voted for George W. Bush in 2000, by 2002, Ritter had become an outspoken critic of the Bush administration's claims that Iraq possessed significant WMD stocks or manufacturing capabilities, the primary rationale given for the U.S. invasion of Iraq in March 2003. Prior to the war, Ritter stated that the U.S.and British governments were using the presence of WMD's in Iraq as a political excuse for war. His views at that time are summarized in War on Iraq: What Team Bush Doesn't Want You To Know a 2002 publication which consists largely of an interview between Ritter and anti-war activist William Rivers Pitt.

Later statements on Iraq
In February 2005, writing on Al Jazeera's website, Ritter wrote that the "Iraqi resistance" is a "genuine grassroots national liberation movement," and "History will eventually depict as legitimate the efforts of the Iraqi resistance to destabilize and defeat the American occupation forces and their imposed Iraqi collaborationist government."

In 2012, Ritter said the U.S. was "bankrupt, morally and fiscally, because of this war. The United States is the laughingstock of the world".

U.S. policy toward Iran
On February 6, 2006, in the James A. Little Theater in Santa Fe, Ritter stated about a U.S. war with Iran: "We just don't know when, but it's going to happen," and said that after the U.N. security Council will have found no evidence of WMD, then Under Secretary of State John Bolton "will deliver a speech that has already been written. It says America cannot allow Iran to threaten the United States and we must unilaterally defend ourselves." and continued "How do I know this? I've talked to Bolton's speechwriter".

Ritter's book Target Iran: The Truth About the White House's Plans for Regime Change was published in 2006. Nathan Guttman in his review for The Forward said Ritter accused the "pro-Israel lobby of dual loyalty and 'outright espionage'". Ritter said that Israel was pushing the Bush administration into war with Iran. He accused the pro-Israel lobby of invoking the Holocaust and of making false claims of antisemitism. Ritter told The Forward "at the end of the day, I would like to believe that most of American Jews will side with America." 

Of Ritter's writing about the  government in Iran, Con Coughlin in The Daily Telegraph wrote that Ritter suggested "that the Bush administration is in danger of making the same mistake over Iran that it did during the build-up to the Iraq war, namely getting the facts to fit the administration's policy of effecting regime change in Tehran". Ritter, Coughlin wrote, concedes the "measures the Iranians have taken in pursuit of nuclear glory" which include the "concealing the existence of key nuclear facilities".

In Shifting Sands
Ritter's documentary In Shifting Sands was released in 2001. It argued that Iraq did not possess weapons of mass destruction because of the UN weapons inspection programme. According to The Washington Times, Ritter's documentary was partially financed by Iraqi American businessman Shakir al Khafaji. Al-Khafaji pled guilty to multiple felony charges in 2004 for his involvement with the U.N. Oil-for-Food scandal. 

Ritter denied any quid pro quo with Al-Khafaji, according to Laurie Mylroie, writing for the Financial Times. When Ritter was asked "how he would characterize anyone suggesting that Mr. Khafaji was offering allocations in [his] name", Mr. Ritter replied: "I'd say that person's a fucking liar ... and tell him to come over here so I can kick his ass."

Arrests and conviction for sex offenses
Ritter was the subject of two law enforcement sting operations in 2001. He was charged in June 2001 with trying to set up a meeting with an undercover police officer posing as a 16-year-old girl. He was charged with a misdemeanor crime of "attempted endangerment of the welfare of a child". The charge was dismissed and the record was sealed after he completed six months of pre-trial probation. After this information was made public in early 2003, Ritter said that the timing of the leak was politically motivated in order to silence his opposition to the Bush administration's push toward war with Iraq.

Ritter was arrested again in November 2009 over communications with a police decoy he met on an Internet chat site. Police said that he exposed himself, via a web camera, after the officer repeatedly identified himself as a 15-year-old girl. Ritter said in his own testimony during the trial that he believed the other party was an adult acting out her fantasy. The chat room had an "age 18 and above" policy, which Ritter stated to the undercover officer. 

The next month, Ritter waived his right to a preliminary hearing and was released on $25,000 unsecured bail. Charges included "unlawful contact with a minor, criminal use of a communications facility, corruption of minors, indecent exposure, possessing instruments of crime, criminal attempt and criminal solicitation". Ritter rejected a plea bargain and was found guilty of all but the criminal attempt count in a courtroom in Monroe County, Pennsylvania, on April 14, 2011. 

In October 2011, he received a sentence of one and a half to five and a half years in prison. He was sent to Laurel Highlands state prison in Somerset County, Pennsylvania, in March 2012 and paroled in September 2014.

Russian invasion of Ukraine 
Ritter rejected the Western media's coverage of the 2022 Russian invasion of Ukraine and has voiced his perspective on multiple podcasts, including Andrew Napolitano's. On April 6, 2022, Ritter was suspended from Twitter for violating its rule on "harassment and abuse" after he posted a tweet claiming that the National Police of Ukraine is responsible for the Bucha massacre and calling U.S. President Joe Biden a "war criminal" for "seeking to shift blame for the Bucha murders" to Russia. The following day Newsweek reported his Twitter account had been reinstated. Ritter has written various articles critical of NATO for the Russian channel RT.

In July 2022, Ritter was added to a list of pro-Russia propagandists compiled by the Ukrainian Center for Countering Disinformation.

Selected bibliography
 Scorpion King: America's Suicidal Embrace of Nuclear Weapons from FDR to Trump (Paperback), Clarity Press, 2020; 2nd revised edition, 
Deal of the Century: How Iran Blocked the West's Road to War (Paperback), Clarity Press, 2017, 
Dangerous Ground: America's Failed Arms Control Policy, from FDR to Obama (Hardcover), 2009 
Waging Peace: The Art of War for the Antiwar Movement, Nation Books, 2007, 
Target Iran: The Truth About the White House's Plans for Regime Change (Hardcover), Nation Books, 2006, 
Iraq Confidential: The Untold Story of the Intelligence Conspiracy to Undermine the UN and Overthrow Saddam Hussein (Hardcover), Foreword by Seymour Hersh, Nation Books, 2006, 
Frontier Justice: Weapons of Mass Destruction and the Bushwhacking of America Context Books, 2003, 
War on Iraq: What Team Bush Doesn't Want You to Know (with William Rivers Pitt). Context Books, 2002, 
Endgame: Solving the Iraq Problem — Once and For All (Hardcover) Simon & Schuster, 1999, ; (paperback) Diane Pub Co, 2004,

See also

Operation Rockingham

References

External links

The Case for Iraq's Qualitative Disarmament Arms Control Today magazine, June 2000
Scott Ritter in His Own Words Time magazine interview, September 2002
Understanding the Roots of Terrorism Caltech University, November 2002
Scott Ritter Warns Against "Politically Motivated Hype" on Iran Nuke Program — video report by Democracy Now!
Scott Ritter's Other War, The New York Times magazine, 22 February 2012

Scott Ritter on the Muck Rack journalist listing site

1961 births
Living people
American anti–Iraq War activists
Iran–United States relations
American foreign policy writers
American male non-fiction writers
United States Marine Corps personnel of the Gulf War
Iraq and weapons of mass destruction
United States Marine Corps officers
Franklin & Marshall College alumni
American officials of the United Nations
20th-century American non-fiction writers
21st-century American non-fiction writers
20th-century American male writers
21st-century American male writers
Russian propagandists